Koteshwar I is a mountain of the Garhwal Himalaya in Uttarakhand, India. It is the 161st highest peak in Uttrakhand. Nanda Devi, is the highest mountain in this category. It lies close to Sudarshan Parbat  in the south. It has two approach route one from Thely Bamak and another from Swetvarn Bamak. Its nearest higher neighbor Sudarshan Parbat  lies 1.3 km North. It is located 5 km SW of Yogeshwar  and 3.2 km east lies Shyamvarn .

Climbing history
In 1978 A ten-member team from Diganta  West Bengal was led by Ashok K. Roy Chowdhury. On September 24 they made their Base Camp at 15,500 feet at the junction of the Raktavarn and Thelu glaciers. Camps I at 17,500 feet and camp II at 18,200 feet were established on September 26 and 28. On September 29 Chowdhury, Samarenda N. Dhar, Ranjan K. Mondai, Robin Banerjee, Amitava Majundar, Sherpas Mingma and Pasang Tsering and high-altitude porter Dawa reached the summit of Koteswar.  A team from west Bengal while claiming the first ascent of Sudarshan Parbat mistakenly climbed Koteshwar according to J C Nanavati of Indian Mountaineering Foundation (IMF). "In 1972? a Calcutta based group claimed a mistaken first ascent of this peak. They had climbed only Koteshwar - 2000 ft lower".

Glaciers and rivers

Koteshwar lies in between two glaciers. On the eastern side lies Swetvarn Glacier and on the western side lies Thelu Glacier. Both these glaciers join Raktavarn Glacier on the south. Finally Raktvarn drains itself at Gangotri Glacier near Gomukh and from there emerges as the Bhagirathi River one of the main tributaries of river Ganga. River Bhagirathi later joins Alaknanda River at Dev Pryag and becomes Ganga there after.

Neighboring peaks

Neighboring peaks of Koteshwar:
 Sri Kailash: 
 Chirbas Parbat 
 Matri 
 Sudarshan Parbat 
 Kalidhang 
 Yogeshwar: 
 Thelu:

See also

 List of Himalayan peaks of Uttarakhand

References

Mountains of Uttarakhand
Six-thousanders of the Himalayas
Geography of Chamoli district